Adam Relson Limbago Jala (born 17 June 1979) is a Filipino lawyer and politician currently serving as the vice mayor of Tagbilaran City since June 30, 2022. Prior to that, he was a member of the Tagbilaran City council from 2013 to 2022 and a member of the House of Representatives of the Philippines representing the Bohol's 3rd congressional district from 2007–2010. He succeeded his father Eladio in the congressional seat.

Jala graduated from University of the Philippines Diliman with a degree in community development. He earned his law degree from Ateneo de Manila University.

Controversy

Jala introduced the Small Town Lottery in Bohol which met opposition by the Catholic Church and some religious orders in Bohol.

References

Members of the House of Representatives of the Philippines from Bohol
21st-century Filipino lawyers
People from Bohol
1979 births
Living people
Lakas–CMD (1991) politicians
University of the Philippines Diliman alumni
Ateneo de Manila University alumni
National Unity Party (Philippines) politicians